Ubykh was a polysynthetic language with a high degree of agglutination that had an ergative-absolutive alignment.

Nouns

Plurality 
Ubykh nouns do not mark plurality and the only case that displays plurality is the relational suffix -. Otherwise plurality is shown either by suppletive verb roots (e.g.  'he is in the car' vs.  'they are in the car') or by verb suffixes:  ('he goes'),  ('they go').

Definiteness 
'the man'). There is no indefinite article directly equivalent to the English a or an, but -(root)- (literally 'one'-(root)-'certain') translates French un : e.g. ('a certain young man').

Cases 
There are two core cases and four non-core cases in Ubykh. The core cases are: relational, absolutive; the non-core cases are: adverbial, locative, instrumental, and instrumental-comitative.

Relational case 
This case displays ergative, genitive, and dative functions. It is marked with - in the singular and - in the plural and is the only case that has a distinction in plurality.

Absolutive case 
Marked with the bare root; this indicates the subject of an intransitive sentence and the direct object of a transitive sentence (e.g.  'a man').

Adverbial case 
This is marked with - and has the primary function of marking essive and translative functions of nouns.

Locative case 
Marked in -, which is the equivalent of English in, on or at.

Instrumental case 
Marked with - and was also treated as a case in Dumézil (1975). This is similar to "by means of" in English.

Instrumental-Comitative case 
Marked with - and broadly means "with".

Other suffixes 
There is also a pair of suffixes that have been noted to be synthetic datives but are not cases in their own right: - ('to[wards]') and - ('for') e.g.  'I will send it to the prince'.

Adjectives 

Pronouns 
Free pronouns in all North-West Caucasian languages lack an ergative-absolutive distinction.

The "standard" pronouns are displayed along with variations that particular speakers used due to rapid speech.

Possessive 

Possessed nouns have their plurality marked with the affix .

Verbs

Verb Template 
The Ubykh verb template is quite complex with 26 slots for the verb.

 Interrogative / subordinative prefixes
 absolutive agreement marker or a prefixed interrogative pronoun
 Oblique-1 marker agreeing with slot 4
 Relational preverb
 Incorporated noun or Oblique-2 marker
 Local preverb
 - or -
 Generic preverb 
 Orientational preverb -
 Ergative preverb marker
 Negation in the dynamic and imperfect tenses or polite imperative
 Causative
 stem
 Intensifying suffix
 Habitual aspect
 Iterative aspect
 Exhaustive aspect
 Excessive aspect
 Continual aspect
 Potential aspect
 Plural marker
 Tense
 Plural marker for dynamic past, conditional II, and stative present.
 Negation in all tenses except for dynamic present
 Affect marker
 Mood or converb markers
 Conjunctive elements

Agreement 
Oblique 1 markers are limited to marking the agreement of a noun before a relational preverb and Oblique 2 markers are used for not only marking agreement with local and directional preverbs but also the simple oblique, or dative, arguments.

The second-person  is an archaic pronoun used to indicate that the person being referred to is a female, or heckling the speaker in some way. It became extinct before the death of the language due to all of the last speakers being male.

The third person agreement markers have a fair amount of variation due to the rules it must follow.

The plural markers exist in the same rules as the singular rules with the exception that singular  can be deleted but plural  cannot.

Dynamic Verb Conjugation 
Dynamic Ubykh verbs are split up in two groups: Group I which contain the simple tenses and Group II which contain derived counterpart tenses. Only the Karaclar dialect uses the progressive tense and the plural is unknown.

The singular-plural distinction is used when the subject, the ergative, is singular or plural.

Square brackets indicate elided vowels; parenthesis indicate optional parts of the stem; and the colon indicates the boundary of a morpheme.

Simple Past 
The verbs in the simple past tense are conjugated with - in the singular and - in the plural.

Examples:

  – to say →  (s)he said
  – to eat →  (s)he ate
  – to know →  (s)he knew
  – to go →  (s)he went

Mirative Past 
The verbs in the mirative past tense are conjugated with - in the singular and - in the plural.

Examples:

  – to say →  (s)he said apparently
  – to eat →  (s)he ate apparently
  – to know →  (s)he knew apparently
  – to go →  (s)he went apparently

Present 
The verbs in the present tense are conjugated with - in the singular and - in the plural.

Examples:

  – to say →  (s)he says
  – to eat →  (s)he eats
  – to know →  (s)he knows
  – to go →  (s)he goes

Future I 
The verbs in the present tense are conjugated with - in the singular and - in the plural. It conveys a sense of certainty, immediacy, obligation, or intentionality.

Examples:

  – to say →  (s)he certainly will say
  – to eat →  (s)he certainly will eat
  – to know →  (s)he certainly will know
  – to go →  (s)he certainly will go

Future II 
The verbs in the present tense are conjugated with - in the singular and - in the plural. It conveys a generic sense of the future as well as an exhortative sense such as:  (let's go!).

Examples:

  – to say →  (s)he will say
  – to eat →  (s)he will eat
  – to know →  (s)he will know
  – to go →  (s)he will go

Pluperfect 
The verbs in the present tense are conjugated with - in the singular and - in the plural. It conveys [TODO]

Examples:

  – to say →  (s)he had said
  – to eat →  (s)he had eaten
  – to know →  (s)he had known
  – to go →  (s)he had gone

Imperfect 
The verbs in the imperfect tense are conjugated with - in the singular and either - in the plural. It conveys a sense of

Examples:

  – to say →  (s)he was saying, (s)he used to say
  – to eat →  (s)he was eating, (s)he used to eatk
  – to know →  (s)he was knowing, (s)he used to know
  – to go →  (s)he was going, (s)he used to go

Conditional I 
The verbs in the present tense are conjugated with - in the singular and - in the plural. It conveys a sense of uncertainty but also a kind of future-in-the-past if the situation had been reversed.

Examples:

  – to say →  (s)he would have said
  – to eat →  (s)he would have eaten
  – to know →  (s)he would have known
  – to go →  (s)he would have went

Conditional II 
The verbs in the present tense are conjugated with - in the singular and - in the plural. It conveys a sense of certainty and intention but also a kind of future-in-the-past if the situation had been reversed.

Examples:

  – to say →  (s)he was going to say
  – to eat →  (s)he was going to eat
  – to know →  (s)he was going to know
  – to go →  (s)he was going to go

Static Verb Conjugation 
In all dialects and speakers, only two static tenses exist: present and past.

Aspect 
There are five basic aspects that exist besides the aspects that exist within the Ubykh tense system. They are: habitual, iterative, exhaustive, excessive, and potential.

A few meanings covered in English by adverbs or auxiliary verbs are given in Ubykh by verb suffixes.

A speaker may combine one of these aspects with another to convey more complex aspects in conjunction with the tenses.

Mood 
There are eleven distinct moods in Ubykh: indicative; direct, polite, and emphatic imperative; potential and frustrative optative; irrealis and realis conditional; binary and complex interrogative.

Indicative 
There is no marker for the indicative mood.

Imperative moods 
There are two forms of the imperative: a formal, more polite imperative and a direct, curt imperative.

Direct 
The direct imperative is usually the omission of the singular tense marker:Versus in the plural:

Polite 
This is formed by adding a - suffix to the verb root. This, however, is sometimes omitted.

Emphatic 
This is formed by adding - to the end of an imperative verb.

Optative moods 
There are two forms of optative present: potential and frustrative optative.

Potential 
This is formed by adding a - suffix to the verb root or /ɐχ/ after a final .

Frustrative 
This is formed by adding a - or -.

Conditional moods 
There are realis and irrealis conditionals.

Realis 
This is marked with -.

Irrealis 
This is marked with -.

Interrogative moods 
Open questions are marked with - and closed questions are marked with -.

Copulas of Existence

Converbs 

Ubykh has a liberal usage of converbs to convey complex sentences.

References

Ubykh language
Northwest Caucasian grammars